Pier Francesco Grimaldi (Genoa, 12 August 1715 - Genoa, 4 January 1791) was the 173rd Doge of the Republic of Genoa.

Biography 
Grimaldi became doge when Ferdinando Spinola renounced his position of doge. The election took place on January 26, 1773. The suppression of the Society of Jesus was imposed during his Dogate, to which the doge and a large part of the Genoese aristocracy were in favor. For this reason Pier Francesco Grimaldi delayed the execution of this order, in agreement with the Jesuit archbishop of Genoa. With pontifical permission he also restricted the right of immunity of churches for outlaws. The dogate ended on January 26, 1775, and Grimaldi continued to work for the Republic. He died in 1791.

See also 

 Republic of Genoa
 Doge of Genoa

References 

18th-century Doges of Genoa
1715 births
1791 deaths